José Gustavo Sand (born 17 July 1980), nicknamed Pepe, is an Argentine professional footballer who plays for Argentinian club Lanús as a striker. He made two appearances for the Argentina national team.

Club career

Early career
Born in Bella Vista, Corrientes, Sand started his professional career with River Plate in 1998. He then had his first spell with Colón between 1999 and 2000. In 2000, he dropped down a division to play for Independiente Rivadavia of the Argentine 2nd Division. In 2000, he joined Brazilian side Vitória. In 2002 Sand returned to Argentina to play for Defensores de Belgrano. He had a second spell with River Plate between 2004 and 2005. Between 2005 and 2006 he played for Banfield, and then returned to Colón in 2006 before joining Lanús in 2007.

Lanús
Sand started his Lanús career by being sent off on his league debut in a 5–3 defeat to Independiente. He then scored ten goals in his next nine league games. His good scoring record of 15 goals in 15 games in his first tournament with Lanús established himself as a favourite amongst the fans. In 2007, he was part of the squad that won the Apertura 2007 tournament, Lanús' first ever top flight league title. Sand became top scorer in the Primera División Argentina for the first time in the Apertura 2008 championship with 15 goals in 19 games. In Clausura 2009 he became the first player to become top scorer in consecutive tournaments since Diego Maradona in 1980. Overall, he scored 50 goals in 67 league matches and 6 in 12 Copa Libertadores matches.

Al Ain
On 7 August 2009, Sand was sold to the Al Ain S.C.C. of Abu Dhabi at $10 million, and presented in Valencia, Spain before media from all over Spain, Argentina and the UAE. He was given the number 9, previously worn by teammate Faisal Ali. In his first match with Al Ain, he scored his first goal on 9 August in a 2–1 loss against Villarreal B. Sand started this season in great form, and score 33 goals in all competitions and scored three hat-tricks in the league against Al Ahli, Al Shabab & Emirates. Sand was awarded the 2009–10 Al Hadath Golden Boot, after scoring 24 goals in 20 league matches, averaging 1.2 goals per match.

Deportivo La Coruña
On 31 January 2011, Deportivo La Coruña announced on their official website that they had acquired the services of Sand for €500,000 on loan for six-months. Deportivo also had a buyout option from Al Ain for €3 million, which could be fulfilled during the summer of that same year.

Club Tijuana
On 30 June 2011, Sand was sold to the Club Tijuana of México for $4 million.

Racing Club
On 8 July 2012, Sand signed a contract with Racing Club in the Argentine Primera División.

Lanús
After a successful spell at Aldosivi, Sand returned to Lanús in December 2015 with the club declaring that he had 'returned home'.

Deportivo Cali
In January 2018, Sand joined Deportivo Cali to help spearhead the Colombian team's attack in their Copa Sudamericana campaign.

Lanús
After one year in Deportivo Cali, Sand signed for Lanús for the third time. The deal was announced on 15 December 2018.

International career
In light of his excellent club form, Sand received his first-ever international call up from Alfio Basile to replace the suspended Carlos Tevez in the national squad for the FIFA World Cup qualifier with Chile in Santiago on 15 October 2008. He made his second appearance for Argentina in a friendly match against Panama on 20 May 2009.

Personal life
Sand's brother, Darío Sand, is also a professional footballer who has played for Club Agropecuario Argentino and San Martín de Tucumán. Sand's aunt, Nancy Sand, is a politician who served as mayor of his hometown of Bella Vista and as a member of the National Congress.

Career statistics

Club

Honours

Lanús
 Primera División Argentina: 2007–08, 2016
 Cup National: 2016

Al Ain
 Al Ain International Championship: 2009, 2010
 Super Cup: 2009

Individual
Argentine Primera División top scorer: 2008 Apertura (with Lanús), 2009 Clausura (with Lanús), 2016 Clausura (with Lanús)'''
 Al Ain International Championship top scorer: 2009, 2010
 Al Hadath Golden Boot: 2010
 Pro-League top scorer: 2009–10
 Copa Libertadores top scorer: 2017

References

External links
José Sand – Argentine Primera statistics at Fútbol XXI  

1980 births
Living people
People from Bella Vista, Corrientes
Argentine people of Scandinavian descent
Argentine footballers
Argentine expatriate footballers
Argentina international footballers
Association football forwards
Club Atlético River Plate footballers
Club Atlético Colón footballers
Independiente Rivadavia footballers
Defensores de Belgrano footballers
Esporte Clube Vitória players
Club Atlético Banfield footballers
Club Atlético Lanús footballers
Al Ain FC players
Deportivo de La Coruña players
Club Tijuana footballers
Racing Club de Avellaneda footballers
Club Atlético Tigre footballers
Argentinos Juniors footballers
Boca Unidos footballers
Aldosivi footballers
Deportivo Cali footballers
Argentine Primera División players
Liga MX players
La Liga players
UAE Pro League players
Categoría Primera A players
Expatriate footballers in Mexico
Expatriate footballers in Brazil
Expatriate footballers in Spain
Expatriate footballers in Colombia
Expatriate footballers in the United Arab Emirates
Argentine expatriate sportspeople in Brazil
Argentine expatriate sportspeople in Spain
Argentine expatriate sportspeople in Colombia
Sportspeople from Corrientes Province